Achyra coelatalis is a moth in the family Crambidae. It was described by Francis Walker in 1859. It is found in Botswana, the Democratic Republic of the Congo, Ghana, Kenya, Réunion, Lesotho, Madagascar, Namibia, Niger, the Seychelles, South Africa, Tanzania, Zambia, Zimbabwe, Australia, India and Sri Lanka.

The larvae have been recorded feeding on Sorghum species, Oryza sativa, Pennisetum americanum and Zea mays.

References

Moths described in 1859
Moths of Africa
Moths of Australia
Moths of Asia
Pyraustinae
Taxa named by Francis Walker (entomologist)